A Proto-Indo-European (PIE) root word may be:

 Proto-Indo-European root noun
 Root aspect (root present and root aorist) in a Proto-Indo-European verb

See also
 Proto-Indo-European root